Alan Osório da Costa Silva (born 19 September 1979), known simply as Alan, is a Brazilian former professional footballer who played as a winger.

He amassed Primeira Liga totals of 400 matches and 51 goals over 16 seasons, representing in the competition Marítimo, Porto, Vitória de Guimarães and Braga. He won two national championships with the second club, and the 2016 Portuguese Cup with the last.

Club career

Marítimo
Alan was born in Salvador, Bahia. After starting professionally with Ipatinga Esporte Clube he moved overseas, joining Portuguese Primeira Liga club C.S. Marítimo in 2001–02 and playing 27 games in his debut season, but slightly fewer in the following. In his third year he scored nine league goals, notably one against Sporting CP in the sixth minute of added time in a 2–1 home win as the Madeiran team qualified to the UEFA Cup after finishing sixth. The next season, on 6 February 2005, he repeated the feat against the same opponent in another victory at the Estádio do Marítimo (3–0).

Porto
Alan joined FC Porto for 2005–06, sharing teams with established Portuguese international Ricardo Quaresma, but still managed 24 league appearances in the campaign (although 14 as a substitute), scoring in a 3–0 home defeat of Rio Ave F.C. on 10 September 2005. In his second year he featured less prominently, being loaned to fellow league side Vitória S.C. for one season.

During 2007–08, Alan played regularly as the Guimarães team achieved a third-place finish in the domestic championship, in its first year after having achieved promotion. During the league campaign he only missed one game and totalled 2,367 minutes of play, finding the net in the last fixture, a 4–0 home win against C.F. Estrela da Amadora.

Braga
In June 2008, Alan was released by Porto and joined Vitória's Minho Province neighbours S.C. Braga on a three-year contract. On 23 October, he scored after an individual effort in a UEFA Cup 3–0 home win over the Premier League's Portsmouth; he also featured in all the league matches, as Braga finished fifth. 

In the following season Alan fared even better by scoring nine goals, again in 30 matches, as the club managed a best-ever runner-up position. In the early fixture, he notably scored against Sporting (2–1 away win) and former club Porto (the only goal in a home victory).

Veteran Alan continued to be first choice for Braga in the following years, when healthy. On 2 October 2012, he scored the second goal in a 2–0 win at Galatasaray SK in the group stage of the UEFA Champions League. He added a brace in the competition's next matchday, but his team lost 2–3 at Manchester United after being 2–0 up.

On 13 April 2013, through a 45th-minute penalty, Alan scored the game's only goal against former team Porto – reduced to ten players prior to that action – to help Braga win the domestic League Cup, a first-ever for them. He retired in June 2017 at almost 38 years of age, remaining tied to his last club in directorial capacities.

Career statistics

Club

Honours
Porto
Primeira Liga: 2005–06, 2006–07
Taça de Portugal: 2005–06
Supertaça Cândido de Oliveira: 2006

Braga
Taça de Portugal: 2015–16; Runner-up 2014–15
Taça da Liga: 2012–13; Runner-up 2016–17
Supertaça Cândido de Oliveira runner-up: 2016
UEFA Europa League runner-up: 2010–11

References

External links

1979 births
Living people
Sportspeople from Salvador, Bahia
Brazilian footballers
Association football wingers
Ipatinga Futebol Clube players
Primeira Liga players
Segunda Divisão players
C.S. Marítimo players
FC Porto players
Vitória S.C. players
S.C. Braga players
Brazilian expatriate footballers
Expatriate footballers in Portugal
Brazilian expatriate sportspeople in Portugal